CGSI may refer to:
 Consumer Guidance Society of India
 Czechoslovak Genealogical Society International